Desailly is a rural locality in the Shire of Mareeba, Queensland, Australia. In the  Desailly had a population of 0 people.

Geography
Desailly has the following mountains in the east of the locality:
  Mount Desailly 
  Mount Elephant 
The Mulligan Highway enters the locality from the south-east (Mount Carbine) and exits to the north (Lakeland).

History 
In the  Desailly had a population of 0 people.

Economy
Spring Hill Outstation is a homestead.

References 

Shire of Mareeba
Localities in Queensland